Curticella is a genus of tephritid  or fruit flies in the family Tephritidae.

Species
Curticella approximans (Walker, 1860)

References

Tephritinae
Tephritidae genera
Diptera of Asia